Swedish Dance Music Awards (also known as Gilbey's Swedish Dance Music Awards and ZTV Dance Music Awards) was a Swedish dance music award that started in 1990 by John Wallin (Pitch Control) and Jonas Siljemark (Siljemark Production). At that time Swedish dance artists had no national media exposure compared to the massive coverage they were receiving internationally. Wallin and Siljemark felt that the home market of such successful artists didn't give the respect the artists deserved. That is how they came up with the idea of the Swedish Dance Music Awards. It was broadcast live on television and radio and got much media coverage.

Swedish Dance Music Awards 1991 (as Swedish Discjockey Music Awards)

 Best Female Artist
 Titiyo (winner)

 Best Male Artist
 Papa Dee (winner)

 Best Breakthrough Artist
 Dr. Alban (winner)

 Best Swedish Group
 Stonefunkers (winner)

 Best Producer
 Magnus Frykberg (winner)

 Best Live Act
 Stonefunkers (winner)

 Best Album
 Titiyo - Titiyo (winner)

 Best Dance Album
 Dr. Alban - Hello Africa The Album (winner)

 Best Hip Hop Album
 Papa Dee - Lettin' Off Steam (winner)

 Best Twelve Inch
 Just D - Vi har vår egen påse (winner)

Best House Twelve Inc
 Clubland - Let's Get Busy (winner)

 Best Remix
 Chrille Falk/Stonebridge (winner)

 Best Record Company
 Swemix (winner)

 Best DJ
 Björn Stavfeldt (winner)

 Best Radio DJ
 Clabbe af Gejerstam (winner)

 Best Nightclub
 Ritz (winner)

 Performances
 Dr. Alban
 Papa Dee 
 Snap!
 Stonefunkers

Swedish Dance Music Awards 1992

Best Male Artist/Crossover
 Tomas Ledin (winner)

 Best Female Artist/Crossover
 Eva Dahlgren (winner)

 Best Dance Album
 Army Of Lovers - Massive Luxury Overdose (winner)

 Best Remix
 Johan Ekelund (winner)

 Best Producer
 Stonebridge (winner)

 Best Album/Crossover
 Eric Gadd - Do You Believe In Gadd? (winner)

 Best Live Act
 Stone-Funkers (winner)

 Best Tweøve Inc
 Rob'n'Raz DLC - Bite the Beat (winner)

 Best Breakthrough Artist
 Gladys (winner)

 Best Radio DJ
 Pontus Enhörning (winner)

 Best TV Show/Music
 Kosmopol (winner)

 Performances
 Army Of Lovers
 DaYeene
 Cecilia Ray
 2 Unlimited

Swedish Dance Music Awards 1993 (as  Gilbey's Dance Music Awards)

 Best Artist/Group
 Clubland (winner)

 Best Breakthrough Artist
 Ace of Base (winner)

 Best Internatyional Dance Artist
 Stereo Mc's (winner)

 Best Dance Album
 Clubland - Adventures Beyond Clubland (winner)

 Best Producer
 Denniz Pop (winner)

 Best Remiz
 Denniz Pop (winner)

 Best Twelce Inch
 Dr. Alban - "It's My Life" (winner)

 Best Radio Dj
 Pontus Enhörning (winner)

 Best TV Show/Music
 Clubbhopping/Swedish Dance Chart (winner)

 Golden Plate Of The Music Business
 Dr. Alban/Denniz Pop (winner)

 Performances
 Ace of Base 
 East 17
 Dr. Alban
 Rob'n'Raz

Swedish Dance Music Awards 1994 (as Gilbey's Dance Music Awards)

 Best Radio DJ
 Amanda Rydman, "Program Signal", P3, Swedish Broadcasting Co. 
 Jesse Wallin, Radio City/Stockholm 
 Mats Nileskar, "Soul Corner, P3, Swedish Broadcasting Co. 
 Pontus Enhörning, "Tval", P3, Swedish Broadcasting Co. (winner)

 Best Newcomer 
 Basic Element
 Pandora 
 Jennifer Brown
 Stakka Bo (winner)

 Best Swedish Dance Track 
 Melodie MC – Dum Da Dum
 Stakka Bo – Here We Go 
 Dr. Alban – Sing Hallelujah
 Rob'n'Raz – In Command (winner)

 Best Swedish Dance Artist/Group  
 Jennifer Brown
 Ace of Base (winner)
 Stakka Bo
 Rob'n'Raz

 Best Swedish Producer
 StoneBridge 
 Statikk & Tom Droid 
 Anders Bagge 
 Denniz Pop (winner) 

 Best Foreign Dance Artist/Group 
 M People
 Culture Beat (winner)
 Haddaway
 Robin S.

 Best Swedish Remixer
 Anders Bagge for Rob'n'Raz/Clubhopping, Papa Dee/Ain't No Sunshine 
 J.J. for Legacy of Sound/Can't Let You Go, Flexx/Wake Up, Jennifer Brown/Heaven Come Down 
 Douglas Carr/Denniz PoP for Dr. Alban/Sing Hallelujah (mixes) 
 Stonebridge for Robin S./Show Me Love, Staxx/Joy, Rage/Give It Up, Legacy Of Sound/Happy, Jennifer Brown/Heaven Come Down (winner)

 Best Swedish Dance Album 
 Stakka Bo – Supermarket
 Rob'n'Raz – Spectrum (winner)
 Ace of Base – Happy Nation - US version
 Pandora – One Of A Kind

 Guldtallrikens Branch Award 
 GSDMA's special jury chose a person/company who did something special for the Swedish dance music industry. 
No nominations, winner was presented at the Awards. 

 ZTV Video Awards Best Swedish Dance Video 
 Stakka Bo – Down the Drain (winner)
 Rob'n'Raz – In Command 
 Just D – Vart tog den söta lilla flickan vägen
 Dr. Alban – Sing Hallelujah 

 ZTV Video Awards Best Music Video (Free music style, any country)
 Voted by ZTV viewers. Nominations and winners presented at the Awards. 

 ZTV Video Awards Best Swedish Video (Free music style) 
 Voted by ZTV's special jury. Nominations and winners presented at the Awards.

 Performances on the TV-show
 Jennifer Brown – Take a Piece of My Heart
 Juliet Roberts – Caught in the Middle
 Stakka Bo – On Your Knees
 Dr Alban – Look Who's Talking
 Maxx – Get-A-Way
 Just D – Vart tog den söta lilla flickan vägen
 Culture Beat – Anything

Swedish Dance Music Awards 1995 (as Gilbey's Dance Music Awards)

 Best Swedish Dance Track 94
 E-Type – This is the Way (winner)
 E-Type – Set the World on Fire
 Herbie – Pick It Up
 Rednex – Cotton Eye Joe

 Best Swedish Remix 94
 3rd Nation – I Believe/Remix by Stonebridge & Nick Nice
 E-Type – This is the Way/Remix by Kristian Lundin & John Amatiello (Amadin)
 Herbie – Pick It Up/Remix By Douglas Carr (winner)
 Melodie MC – Give It Up/Remix by Denniz Pop

 Best Swedish Producer
 Anders Bagge for Fatima Rainey, Jennifer Brown
 Denniz Pop for Dr. Alban, E-Type, Herbie (winner)
 Pat Reiniz for Rednex, Cool James
 Stonebridge for Robin S., 3rd Nation, Sabrina Johnston, Shawn Christopher

 Best Swedish Underground 94
 MONDAY BAR (Downtown Stockhold) For their great club evenings
 Record Label CLUBVISION
 Record Label LOOP
 StoneBridge For all his clubgrooves (winner)

 Best Newcomer 94
 E-Type (winner)
 Herbie
 Latin Kings
 Rednex

 Best Swedish Dance Video 94
 Dr. Alban – Let the Beat Go On (Director: Jonathan Bate)
 E-Type – This is the Way (Director: Matthew Broadley)
 Herbie – Pick It Up (Director: Debbie Bourne)
 Rednex – Cotton Eye Joe (Director: Stefan Berg) (winner)

 Best Swedish Dance Album 94 
 Basic Element – Basic Injection
 Dr. Alban – Look Who's Talking (winner)
 E-Type – Made in Sweden
 Cool James & Black Teacher – Zooming You

 Best International Dance Artist
 Ice MC
 M People
 Reel 2 Real (winner)
 Warren G

 Best Swedish Dance Artist 94
 Herbie
 Ace of Base
 E-Type (winner)
 Rednex

 Guldtallrikens Branch Award 94
 Stockholm Records (winner)

Swedish Dance Music Awards 1996

 Best Dance Artist
 Herbie (winner)

 Best Dance Album
 Infinite Mass – The Infinite Patio (winner)

 Best Newcomer
 Robyn (winner)

 Best Hip Hop/R&B Artist
 Infinite Mass (winner)

 Best Swedish Dance Track
 Herbie – Right Type of Mood
 Infinite Mass – Area Turns Red (winner)
 Papa Dee – The First Cut Is the Deepest

 Dance Song Of The Year
 Robin Cook – I Won't Let the Sun Go Down (winner)

 Best Swedish Producer
 Stonebridge & Nick Nice
 Denniz Pop & Max Martin (winner)
 Pierre Jerksten
 Douglas Carr

 Best Remixer
 Stonebridge & Nick Nice (winner)
 Pierre Jerksten
 JJ
 DJ Blackhead

 Best Foreign Dance Artist
 Coolio (winner)

 Special Music Industry Prize
 Mats Nileskar for his radio programme "Soulcorner" (winner)

 Best Underground
 Dunkla Recordings (winner)

 ZTV Viewers Prize For Best Scandinavian Video
 Addis Black Widow – Innocent (winner)

Swedish Dance Music Awards 1997

 Best Swedish Dance Artist 1996
 Lutricia McNeal
 Rob'n'Raz DLC
 E-Type (winner)
 Papa Dee

 Best Swedish Producer 1996
 EZ Production
 Denniz Pop & Max Martin for work with Leila K, Papa Dee and George (winner)
 Pierre Jerksten
 Stonebridge

 Best Swedish Dance Album 1996
 Blacknuss - Allstars
 E-Type - Explorer
 Papa Dee - The Journey
 Rob'n'Raz – Circus (winner)

 Best Swedish Breakthrough Artist 1996
 George
 George Cole
 Goldmine
 Lutricia McNeal – Ain't That Just the Way (winner)

 Best House/Techno Artist 
 Antiloop
 Cari Lekebusch
 Pierre Jerksten
 Tellus (Pierre Jerksten project)

 Best Swedish Remix 1996
 Antiloop for E-Type
 Pierre J for Dr. Alban, Knockabout & Tellus 
 Rob'n'Raz for Rob'n'Raz (Take a Ride) (winner)
 Stonebridge for Inner Circle, Goldmine & Tanya Louise

 Best Swedish Dance Song 1996
 Blacknuss - Dinah
 Lutricia McNeal - Ain't That Just the Way
 Rob'n'Raz – Take A Ride (winner) 
 Robin Cook - I Won't Let The Sun Go Down

 Best International Dance Artist 1996
 2Pac & Dr. Dre
 Faithless (winner)
 The Fugees
 The Prodigy

 Swedish Hip Hop/R&B Artist 1996
 Blacknuss (winner)
 Lutricia McNeal
 Rob'n'Raz Circus
 Robyn

 ZTV's Best Dance Video 1996 Award
 Lutricia McNeal - Ain't That Just the Way
 E-Type – Free Like a Flying Demon (winner)
 Rob'n'Raz feat. D-Flex - Take A Ride
 Leila K - Rude Boy

Swedish Dance Music Awards 1998

 Best House/Techno
 Antiloop (winner)

 Best Album
 Antiloop (winner)

 Best Dance Track
 Antiloop – In My Mind (winner)

 Best Artist/Group
 Antiloop (winner)

 Best R&B Artist
 Eric Gadd (winner)

 Best Producer
 Denniz Pop (winner)

 Best Newcomers
 Drömhus (winner)

 Best Remix
 Cue – Burnin' (C&N Project Remix) (winner)

 Best Foreign Dance Artist
 Sash! (winner)

References

Awards established in 1990
1990 establishments in Sweden
Swedish music awards